Quraish Pur, born Zulqarnain Qureshi (1932 – 5 August 2013) was a scholar, writer, novelist, columnist and media expert of Pakistan. He gained fame from hosting the TV program Kasuti (PTV) in the 1970s with Obaidullah Baig.

Career and legacy
Quraish Pur joined PTV in 1973 and worked there in various positions including the hosting of some shows until 1992, when he decided to retire.

Quraish Pur was also known to his associates and friends as an affable and a gentle person. Sahar Ansari, a noted Urdu scholar who had a long association and working relationship with Quraish Pur, said that even when he was very angry, he did not use harsh language or resorted to throwing temper tantrums. Instead, he would try to defuse the situation through some courteous ways.

Quraish Pur along with his colleagues on Kasauti TV show – Obaidullah Baig, Iftikhar Arif and later Ghazi Salahuddin were all known among the Pakistani public for their extraordinary knowledge of history, literature, geography and the sciences.

TV Shows hosted
 Kasauti (1967 – 1972) - a quizz TV show with 20 questions (reruns of this TV show were shown in the 1990s)
 Lafz ki Talaash
 Sheeshay Ka Ghar
 Zauq-e-Aagahi
 UN Quiz

Death
He died on 5 August 2013 in Karachi after a protracted illness. His burial took place at the Paposh Nagar Graveyard in Karachi, Pakistan.

References

Pakistani television people
Pakistani television hosts
Pakistani male writers
Urdu-language writers
Pakistani columnists
Pakistani novelists
Urdu-language novelists
Pakistani scholars
2013 deaths
1932 births
Male novelists
20th-century novelists
20th-century Indian male writers